Grevillea infundibularis, commonly known as fan-leaf grevillea, is a species of flowering plant in the family Proteaceae and is endemic to a restricted area in the south of Western Australia. It is a spreading to low-lying shrub with egg-shaped to hemispherical leaves and clusters of four to eight bright red flowers.

Description

Taxonomy
Grevillea infundibularis was first formally described in 1974 by Alex George in the journal Nuytsia from specimens he collected on Middle Mount Barren in 1970. The specific epithet (infundibularis) means "funnel-shaped", referring to the leaves.

Distribution and habitat
Fan-leaf grevillea occurs in part of the Fitzgerald River National Park in the Esperance Plains bioregion where it grows in heathland among small to medium trees.

Conservation status
Grevillea infundibularis is listed as "endangered" under the Australian Government Environment Protection and Biodiversity Conservation Act 1999 and as Threatened Flora (Declared Rare Flora — Extant) by the Western Australian Government Department of Biodiversity, Conservation and Attractions. The main threat to the species is its restricted distribution but potentially also by inappropriate fire regimes and dieback caused by Phytophthora cinnamomi.

References

Eudicots of Western Australia
infundibularis
Proteales of Australia
Plants described in 1974
Taxa named by Alex George